Mount Malabar is a stratovolcano, located immediately south of Bandung, West Java, Indonesia. The profile is broad with basaltic andesite, type of geological stone.

See also 

 List of volcanoes in Indonesia
 Malabar Radio Station

References 

Bandung Regency
Malabar
Malabar
Pleistocene stratovolcanoes